The Anti-Black Box Curriculum Movement was a Taiwanese student protest, against certain proposed senior high school curriculum changes. "Black box" is a reference to the students' concerns about the opaqueness of the proposed change. On 23 July 2015, the protesters stormed the Ministry of Education.

The proposed changes to the high school history curriculum included the mention in textbooks of Japanese war crimes during their occupation of Taiwan and the acknowledgement of comfort women sex-slavery in Asia. Students also protested what they felt was too much straight regurgitation and Buxiban cramming in the educational system, as well as perceived corruption and mafia connections among politicians.

See also
 List of protests in the 21st century

References

External links
 President Ma's "Black Box" Problem
 Guideline changes to be undone

Student protests in Taiwan
Nonviolent resistance movements
Politics of Taiwan
Cross-Strait relations
2015 in Taiwan
2015 protests